Haitham Al-Khulaif (born 24 January 1997) is a Saudi Arabian professional footballer who plays as a midfielder for Saudi Second Division club Hajer.

Al-Khulaif is an academy graduate of Hajer. He made his debut during the 2016–17 season and has been a starter ever since. On 3 August 2018, Al-Khulaif signed a 3-year contract with Hajer keeping him at the club until 2021. He was first called to the U23 national team in December 2018, during the Taif training camp.

Honours
Hajer
Saudi Second Division: 2019–20

References

External links
 

1997 births
Living people
People from Al-Hasa
Saudi Arabian footballers
Association football midfielders
Saudi First Division League players
Saudi Second Division players
Hajer FC players
Saudi Arabia youth international footballers
Saudi Arabian Shia Muslims